Qushi'an (Mandarin: 曲什安镇) is a town under the jurisdiction of Xinghai County, Hainan Tibetan Autonomous Prefecture, Qinghai, China, surrounded by Bagou Township of Tongde County across the Yellow River to the east, Zhongtie and Longzang townships to the south, Wenquan Township to the west and Tangnaihai Township to the north. As of 2010, Qushi'an has a total population of 5,389: 2,958 males and 2,431 females: 1,248 aged under 14, 3,897 aged between 15 and 64 and 244 aged over 65.

References 

Hainan Tibetan Autonomous Prefecture
Township-level divisions of Qinghai